The 2009 Air New Zealand Cup was a provincial rugby union competition in New Zealand, which was run as a round-robin tournament from 30 July to 25 October. There were 13 rounds where every team played each other once. The top four teams on the Air New Zealand Cup table advanced to the semi-finals, where they played for a chance in the Grand Final.

Most weeks, one game was played on Thursday at 7:35 pm (NZ Time), two games on Fridays both starting at 7:35 pm, three games on Saturdays at 2:35, 5:30 and 7:35 pm and one game on Sundays at 2:35 pm. Again, this is most common, there were games played at 4:30 or 6:30 pm and more or less games played on certain days, e.g. Thursdays and Saturdays.

Standings

Points Table

Ladder Progression

Schedule

|-border="2" cellpadding="5" cellspacing="1" bgcolor=#ccccff
| width=14% align=center|Round 1
| width=14% align=center|Round 2
| width=14% align=center|Round 3
| width=14% align=center|Round 4
| width=14% align=center|Round 5
| width=14% align=center|Round 6
| width=14% align=center|Round 7
|-align=center
| 30 Jul-2 Aug
| 06-09 Aug
| 13-16 Aug
| 20-23 Aug
| 27-30 Aug
| 03-06 Sept
| 10-13 Sept

|-bgcolor=#ccccff
| width=14% align=center|Round 8
| width=14% align=center|Round 9
| width=14% align=center|Round 10
| width=14% align=center|Round 11
| width=14% align=center|Round 12
| width=14% align=center|Round 13
|-align=center
| 17-20 Sept
| 24-27 Sept
| 01-04 Oct
| 08-11 Oct
| 15-18 Oct
| 22-25 Oct

Round 1
 The highlight of round one was the first up Ranfurly Shield challenge when Wellington beat Otago 23-19, Otago had the chance to own the shield for the first time in 52 years.
 On Saturday, three of the major unions went down to their lesser counterparts;
 Hawke's Bay recorded its first win over Auckland in Air New Zealand/NPC history and their first win over Auckland since 1974.
 North Harbour recorded a shock win over defending champions Canterbury in their first game of the season, Michael Harris lead the 22-19 victory recording 17 points.
 Southland beat Waikato 16-6, their first win over the Mooloo men since 2003.

Round 2
 Northland chose to switch their home game to North Harbour Stadium after determining that Okara Park would be unsuitable on account of bad field conditions.
 When Southland beat Otago 26-19 at Carisbrook, it was the 232nd time these two teams had matched up, the most played provincial rivalry in New Zealand rugby.
 Tasman's 19-15 victory over North Harbour on 7 August was the first time in their history that they have beaten them.

Round 3
 When Northland ran out onto the field at the Kerikeri Domain it was the first time they have played in the province outside of Whangarei since 1976, and the first time Kerikeri have hosted an Air New Zealand/NPC match.
 Taranaki and Hawke's Bay played in the first drawn match of the season when they matched up 24 a piece at the full-time whistle, it was also refereed for the first time by a referee outside the country with Australian Nathan Pearce taking the officiators duty.
 On 16 August Tasman and Counties Manukau played against each other for the first time in their history with Tasman winning 51-15.

Round 4
 Wellington won their second Ranfurly Shield challenge 16-15 against Auckland on 22 August, with some significant moments,
 it is now the longest Wellington has held onto the shield since 1953; and
 Fa'atonu Fili landed his 3rd drop goal of the competition, the most in any Air New Zealand Cup season, it also made Wellington the holder of the most drop goals in a season by a team with 2 being the previous record.
 When Canterbury beat Tasman 25 to 21, it was the closest that Tasman had come to winning against their Crusader counterparts.
 Counties Manukau were only team left in the competition without a win but ended that when they recorded a 33-21 win over Taranaki on 23 August.

Round 5
 Wellington lost the Ranfurly Shield in Round 5, losing 36-14 to Canterbury on 29 August.
 When Southland beat North Harbour 24 to 22, it was the first time Southland had beaten North Harbour at their home stadium.
 Hawke's Bay scored the first penalty try of the season in their 28-26 victory over Tasman on 28 August.
 Auckland and Bay of Plenty contested for the new trophy, the John Drake Boot, named after John Drake, who died December 2008, Auckland won the trophy by winning 29 points to 14. This was also Bay of Plenty's first loss of the season.

Round 6
 Southland and Northland started off round 6 with a draw when both teams locked up at 15 all, it was the second draw of the season.
 When Wellington beat Counties Manukau on 4 September, Hosea Gear equaled the record for most tries in one game with 4.
 The upset of the round was when Bay of Plenty beat Canterbury 19 points to 17, right after Canterbury had won the Ranfurly Shield off Wellington

Round 7
 Canterbury hosted their first Ranfurly Shield challenge against Otago on 12 September, which they won 36-16.
 When Tasman played Waikato on 11 September, it was officiated by Australian Andrew Lees, who was the second Australian to referee an Air New Zealand Cup match this season.
 When Taranaki beat Wellington on 10 September, it was their first NPC/Air New Zealand Cup win over Wellington in 20 years.
 When Southland beat Bay of Plenty 19-12 on 11 September, they earned the 4 competition points to gain them the top position on the points table, the first time ever Southland have achieved this in the first division of New Zealand provincial rugby.

Round 8
 Canterbury successfully hosted their second Ranfurly Shield match of the season when they beat Taranaki 29 points to 17.
 North Harbour won the 29th edition of the Battle of the bridge against Auckland, only the sixth time they've beat them and the first time since 2004.

Round 9
 Englishman Wayne Barnes refereed the game between Wellington and Southland, he was the third referee outside the country to referee an Air New Zealand Cup match this season.
 Canterbury successfully held their third Ranfurly Shield challenge against Northland when they beat them 31-21.
 Tasman recorded their first ever win over Auckland in their four-year history, even though it was only the second time they've played each other.

Round 10
 Counties Manukau were the first team in this year's competition to be eliminated from semifinal contention when they lost to Canterbury on 2 October.

Round 11
 Canterbury successfully held their fourth Ranfurly Shield challenge against Manawatu on 9 October, winning 50-26.
 Canterbury became the first team in the competition to qualify for the semifinals with their victory over Manawatu.
 Despite sitting in 10th place immediately after their loss on 9 October, Manawatu was the second team to be eliminated from semifinal contention.
 When Hawke's Bay beat Counties Manukau 54-8, it was the largest winning margin between the two teams.
 Northland's David Holwell celebrated his 100th game for the province against his old union, Wellington on 11 October.
 Taranaki and Tasman were the first teams this season to be held scoreless, when they played Auckland and Southland on 9 and 10 October.
 Otago was eliminated from semifinal contention when they lost to Waikato. Waikato's victory also eliminated North Harbour and Northland bringing the total of eliminated teams to five.

Round 12
 By defeating Hawke's Bay on 15 October, Canterbury ensured home field advantage in the semifinal and (should they reach it) the final.
 Taranaki became the sixth team be eliminated from playoff contention when they lost to Southland on 16 October.
 Bay of Plenty became the seventh team be eliminated from playoff contention when Wellington beat North Harbour on 17 October.
 Tasman became the eighth team to be eliminated from playoff contention when they lost to Otago on 17 October.  They were also held scoreless for the second straight week after losing to Southland in Round 11 41-0.
 The Wellington Lions played in specially designed white jerseys in their 17 October match against North Harbour to help raise funds and awareness for the Samoa Tsunami appeal.

Round 13
 Six teams remained in contention for the semi-finals at the beginning of the round (Canterbury, Wellington, Southland, Waikato, Hawke's Bay and Auckland); and of these only Canterbury was guaranteed a position.
 Southland obtained the Ranfurly Shield for the first time since 1959 when they beat Canterbury 9 points to 3 on 22 October.  In the process, they became the second team to book themselves a place in the semi-finals.
 Wellington clinched a home semi-final after their win against Tasman on 23 October.  The victory also cemented Southland as the third-place team in the Round Robin and as Wellington's semifinal opponent.
 Auckland was the ninth team to be eliminated from semifinal contention with Hawke's Bay victory over Northland on 23 October.
 Manawatu beat North Harbour for the first time ever, winning 42-16 on 24 October. Manawatu's Andre Taylor also equaled the record for most points scored in an Air New Zealand Cup game with 27, including 2 tries, 2 penalty goals, 4 conversions and 1 drop goal.
 Hawke's Bay won the last playoff spot and Waikato was the tenth and final team eliminated from semifinal contention when Auckland beat Waikato on 24 October.

See also
 Air New Zealand Cup
 2009 Air New Zealand Cup

References

Round